Tom Smith was an Irish fencer. He competed in the individual and team foil events at the 1948 Summer Olympics.

References

External links
 

Year of birth missing
Year of death missing
Irish male foil fencers
Olympic fencers of Ireland
Fencers at the 1948 Summer Olympics
20th-century Irish people